Igbo may refer to:
 Igbo people, an ethnic group of Nigeria
 Igbo language, their language
 anything related to Igboland, a cultural region in Nigeria

See also 
 Ibo (disambiguation)
 Igbo mythology
 Igbo music
 Igbo art
 
 Igbo-Ukwu, a town in the Nigerian state of Anambra
 Ijebu Igbo, a town in the Nigerian state of Ogun
 Igbo bu Igbo

Language and nationality disambiguation pages